The Lotus Eaters is a BBC television drama first broadcast in 1972 and 1973.

The series, written by Michael J. Bird, dealt with the lives of British expatriates living on the island of Crete, and their reasons for being there.

Plot
The central characters were a married couple, Erik (Ian Hendry) and Ann Shepherd (Wanda Ventham), who ran a tavern called "Shepherd's Bar".

Ann is revealed in the first episode to be a sleeper agent of British Intelligence, Erik having been a broken-down drunk whom she was made to marry as part of her cover story. Other episodes dealt with the other expatriates who frequented the bar. The most intriguing character in both series is the Greek police captain, Michael Krasakis (Stefan Gryff). In the second series the British Intelligence aspect is developed, until a clash with Soviet and Chinese agents results in both Ann and Erik having to leave Crete. In the final scene, about to board a plane leaving Heraklion airport, they have a partial reconciliation, since each is the only person the other can trust.

Cast 

Main cast:
 Ian Hendry as Erik Shepherd
 Wanda Ventham as Ann Shepherd
 Maurice Denham as Nestor Turton
 Stefan Gryff as Captain Michael Krasakis
 Anthony Stamboulieh as Nikos

Recurring cast – Series 1 only:
 James Kerry as Donald Culley (eps. 1, 3, 8–9)
 Thorley Walters as Major Edward Woolley (eps. 1–4)
 Sylvia Coleridge as Miriam Woolley (eps. 1–4)
 Julia Goodman as Kirsten McLuhan (eps. 1–2, 4–5, 7, 9)
 Martin Howells as Mark Potter (eps. 1–2, 4–5, 7, 9)
 Karan David as Katerina (eps. 1–6, 8–9)
 Carol Cleveland as Leigh Mervish (eps. 1–4, 7)
 Karl Held as Philip "Pip" Mervish (eps. 1–4, 7)

Recurring cast – Series 2 only:
 Timothy Carlton as Gerard Mace
 John Horsley as Sir Hugh Russell (eps. 2–4)
 Paul Maxwell as Sam Webber (eps. 2–6)
 Susan Engel as Imogen Lundqvist (eps. 2–6)
 Frank Duncan as Cotton
 Godfrey James as Nicholson
 Ronald Howard as Dr John Dartington (eps. 2–6)
 Calliope Petrohilos as Ariadne Mazonaki (eps. 2–6)

Production
Location scenes in The Lotus Eaters were filmed in the Cretan resort of Aghios Nikolaos and derived its title from the lotus-eaters of Greek mythology, where those who ate the fruit of the lotus tree lost the desire to return home.

The series was also the first of the Mediterranean-based dramas written by Michael J Bird for the BBC. The others included Who Pays the Ferryman?, also set in Crete; The Aphrodite Inheritance, set in Cyprus; and The Dark Side of the Sun, set in Rhodes.

The series' theme is "Ta Trena Pou Fyghan" (Τα Τραίνα Που Φύγαν" = "The Trains That Departed), from the album Hellespont, composed by Stavros Xarchakos.

Episode details
Series 1

Series 2

References

External links

Michael J. Bird Tribute Site
Official Website of Ian Hendry

1970s British drama television series
1972 British television series debuts
1973 British television series endings
BBC television dramas
English-language television shows